The 2013–14 LNAH season was the 18th season of the Ligue Nord-Américaine de Hockey (before 2004 the Quebec Semi-Pro Hockey League), a minor professional league in the Canadian province of Quebec. Eight teams participated in the regular season, which was won by the Trois-Rivières Viking. Jonquière Marquis won the playoff championship.

Regular season

Coupe Canam-Playoffs

External links
 LNAH Official Website

Ligue Nord-Américaine de Hockey seasons
3